Kyrgyzstan is one of four former Soviet republics in Central Asia to have Russian as a de jure official language. The Kyrgyz language was adopted as the official language in 1991. After pressure from the Russian and other minorities in the country, the republic adopted Russian as an official language as well in 1997, to become an officially bilingual country.

Official languages
The languages of government in Kyrgyzstan are Russian as the official and interethnic language and Kyrgyz as the state/national language.

Kyrgyz is a Turkic language of the Kipchak branch, closely related to Kazakh, Karakalpak, and Nogay Tatar. It was written in the Arabic alphabet until the twentieth century. Latin script was introduced and adopted in 1928, and was subsequently replaced on Stalin's orders by Cyrillic script in 1941. As a result of the pending language reform in neighboring Kazakhstan, Kyrgyzstan will be the only independent Turkic-speaking country in a few years that exclusively uses the Cyrillic script.

According to the 2009 census, 4.1 million people spoke Kyrgyz as native or second language and 2.5 million spoke Russian as native or second language, with 482,000 specifically identifying as native speakers. Russian is the most widely spoken second language, followed by Kyrgyz and Uzbek.

Russian TV media enjoy enormous popularity in Kyrgyzstan, especially in Russian-speaking city of Bishkek and Chüy Region. Russian media outlets have an enormous impact on public opinion in Kyrgyzstan, especially in areas such as human rights and international political developments. The Russian dialects spoken in Kyrgyzstan are referred to as Kyrgyz(stani) Russian.

Many business and political affairs are carried out in Russian. Russian was the primary language of the government of the Kirghiz Soviet Socialist Republic for decades. Until recently, Kyrgyz remained a language spoken at home and was rarely used during meetings or other events. However, most parliamentary meetings today are conducted in Kyrgyz, with simultaneous interpretation available for those who do not speak Kyrgyz. However a great number of Russian-speaking residents of Kyrgyzstan have left since independence.

Education 
Following the 2005 Tulip Revolution, educational reforms in 2007 required that Kyrgyz become a required subject in non-Kyrgyz-language schools, and that Russian become a required subject in schools with a language of instruction other than Russian. The Kyrgyz-Russian Slavic University, one of the top universities of Kyrgyzstan, is a Russian-medium institution and therefore fluency in Russian is still extremely valuable in higher education.

Minority languages 
Uzbek is spoken by approximately 850 thousand residents of Kyrgyzstan and is the second most spoken native language, ahead of Russian and behind Kyrgyz.

In 2011, Almazbek Atambayev won a highly contested elections marked by irregularities by the Organization for Security and Co-operation in Europe (OSEC). The Atambayev government subsequently banned graduating high school students from taking exit examinations in Uzbek, or any language other than Kyrgyz or Russian.

Aside from Turkic languages, Tajik, an Iranian language, is also spoken by some.

Language by number of speakers

Bishkek
In Bishkek, Russian is the main language, while Kyrgyz continues losing ground, especially among the younger generations.

See also
Demographics of Kyrgyzstan

References